HH 34 is a Herbig–Haro object located in the Orion A molecular cloud at a distance of about 460 parsecs (1500 light-years). It is notable for its highly collimated jet and very symmetric bow shocks. A bipolar jet from the young star is ramming into surrounding medium at supersonic speeds, heating the material to the point of ionization and emission at visual wavelengths. The source star is a class I protostar with a total luminosity of 45 . Two bow shocks separated by 0.44 parsecs make the primary HH 34 system. Several larger and fainter bow shocks were later discovered on either side, making the extent of the system around 3 parsecs. The jet blows up the dusty envelope of the star, giving rise to 0.3 parsec long molecular outflow.

See also
HH 46/47
Stellar evolution
Hayashi track
Pre-main-sequence star

References

External links
 
 

Orion (constellation)
Orion molecular cloud complex
34